The canton of Chaumont-2 is an administrative division of the Haute-Marne department, northeastern France. It was created at the French canton reorganisation which came into effect in March 2015. Its seat is in Chaumont.

It consists of the following communes:
Buxières-lès-Villiers
Chamarandes-Choignes
Chaumont (partly)
Laville-aux-Bois
Villiers-le-Sec

References

Cantons of Haute-Marne